Chlorobenzilate is a pesticide that is not currently used in the United States or Europe.  It was originally developed by Ciba-Geigy and introduced in 1952. It was used as an acaricide against mites on citrus trees, including deciduous fruit trees. It has been detected as a residue on tomatoes found in Japanese markets in 2005. It is a non-systemic pesticide that works through contact and as a neurotoxin: it disrupts the functioning of the nervous system.

In the pure state, chlorobenzilate is a colorless to pale yellow solid, but the commercial product is a brownish liquid. It is only slightly soluble in water, but miscible with acetone, toluene and methanol.

Toxicity
There is no data on the carcinogenic effects of chlorobenzilate in humans. However, when mice were administered the substance orally, carcinogenic effects were observed. The U.S. Environmental Protection Agency has therefore classified chlorobenzilate as a probable human carcinogen (Group B2). The International Agency for Research on Cancer has concluded that there is insufficient information available to evaluate the carcinogenicity of chlorobenzilate in humans.

Chlorobenzilate is a persistent organic pollutant and is very toxic to aquatic invertebrates.

Regulation
After carcinogenicity was established in mice, the use of chlorobenzilate was banned in the United States in 1979, except for citrus cultivation. After 1999, it was banned completely. In the European Union, its use is also currently banned.

International trade in chlorobenzilate is regulated by the Rotterdam Convention.

References

Pesticides
Chlorobenzenes
Carboxylate esters